Dominique Locatelli (born 3 January 1961) is a French cross-country skier. He competed at the 1980 Winter Olympics, the 1984 Winter Olympics and the 1988 Winter Olympics.

References

External links
 

1961 births
Living people
French male cross-country skiers
Olympic cross-country skiers of France
Cross-country skiers at the 1980 Winter Olympics
Cross-country skiers at the 1984 Winter Olympics
Cross-country skiers at the 1988 Winter Olympics
Sportspeople from La Tronche
20th-century French people
21st-century French people